Growing Up Live is a concert film by Hamish Hamilton and Peter Gabriel. It features a live performance from Gabriel's 2003 "Growing Up" tour. The concert is notable for its dynamic set design by Robert Lepage. Also of note is the addition of Melanie Gabriel, his daughter, for backing vocals in this concert footage. Bonus features include Tony Levin's photo album selections and an interview with Peter Gabriel about the story of Growing Up.

In 2019, the film was released as a live album for the first time ever on music streaming platforms and on vinyl.

Background
Gabriel spent part of 2002-2003 on tour in support of his album Up. The tour, called the "Growing Up" tour, visited 32 cities across North America and Europe. The concert video and live album were taken from the performances over two nights in Milan in May 2003. Gabriel described the idea behind the staging of the concert: "Last time [for the Secret World tour] we had two stages, a male stage and a female stage, and they were representing different things, urban, rural and this time we have moved the axis vertically, and it’s a sky stage and an earth stage. The album title had been UP, so there was a certain logic to this vertical translation onto the stage." Performing guests for the show included The Blind Boys of Alabama, Dr Hukwe Zawose, Charles Zawose, Sevara Nazarkhan and the voice of Nusrat Fateh Ali Khan.

Track listing
All songs are written by Peter Gabriel.
 "Here Comes the Flood" – 8:37
 "Darkness" – 8:39
 "Red Rain" – 6:14
 "Secret World" – 9:06
 "Sky Blue" – 7:47
 "Downside Up" – 7:36
 "The Barry Williams Show" – 9:19
 "More than This" – 6:09
 "Mercy Street" – 7:39
 "Digging in the Dirt" – 7:36
 "Growing Up" – 6:14
 "Animal Nation" – 8:12
 "Solsbury Hill" – 4:45
 "Sledgehammer" – 4:59
 "Signal to Noise" – 9:39
 "In Your Eyes" – 11:34
 "Father, Son" – 6:15

Personnel
 Peter Gabriel – lead vocals, keyboards.
 Richard Evans – guitars, mandolin, whistles, backing vocals.
 Melanie Gabriel – lead and backing vocals.
 Tony Levin – bass, electric upright bass, backing vocals.
 Ged Lynch – drums, percussions.
 David Rhodes – guitars, backing vocals.
 Rachel Z – keyboards, backing vocals.
Special Guests
 The Blind Boys of Alabama – additional backup vocals for "Sky Blue".
 Sevara Nazarkhan – additional backup vocals for "In Your Eyes".
 Toir Kuziyev - doutar (long necked oud) on "In Your Eyes".

Charts

Certifications

References

Peter Gabriel albums
Peter Gabriel video albums
Films directed by Hamish Hamilton (director)
2003 video albums
2019 live albums
Real World Records live albums
Republic Records live albums
Virgin EMI Records albums
Geffen Records video albums
Virgin Records video albums